The deltopectoral groove is an indentation in the muscular structure between the deltoid muscle and pectoralis major.

It is the location through which the cephalic vein passes and where the coracoid process is most easily palpable.

See also
 Deltopectoral triangle

Additional images

References

External links
 Diagram at anatomyatlases.org (see #91)
 http://ect.downstate.edu/courseware/haonline/labs/L06/020200.htm

Upper limb anatomy